Street Sounds Crucial Electro is the first compilation album in a series and was released in 1984 on the StreetSounds label. The album was released on LP and cassette and contains ten electro music and old school hip hop tracks mixed by Herbie Laidley.

Track listing

References
2. This record was featured playing in the cult classic comedy/horror movie 'Shaun Of The Dead' with the song "Don't Stop Be Bop" playing. The album is thrown outside the window by Shaun's angry flatmate, and later is thrown at a zombie, where Shaun (Simon Pegg) says it was the second album he ever bought.

External links
 Street Sounds Crucial Electro at Discogs

1984 compilation albums
Hip hop compilation albums
Electro compilation albums